Elections to the Australian Capital Territory Legislative Assembly were held on Saturday, 15 February 1992, alongside a referendum on an electoral system for future elections. The incumbent Labor Party, led by Rosemary Follett, was challenged by the Liberal Party, led by Trevor Kaine. Candidates were elected to fill seats using the modified d'Hondt electoral system for a multi-member single constituency. The result was another hung parliament. However, Labor, with the largest representation in the 17-member unicameral Assembly, formed Government with the support of Michael Moore and Helen Szuty. Follett was elected Chief Minister at the first sitting of the second Assembly on 27 March 1992.

Key dates

 Close of party registration: 9 January 1992
 Pre-election period commenced/nominations opened: 10 January 1992
 Rolls closed: 17 January 1992
 Nominations closed: 24 January 1992
 Polling day: 15 February 1992
 Poll declared: 20 March 1992

Overview

Candidates

Sitting members at the time of the election are listed in bold. Tickets that elected at least one MLA are highlighted in the relevant colour. Successful candidates are indicated by an asterisk (*).

Retiring Members
 Hector Kinloch MLA (Residents Rally)
 Carmel Maher MLA (Independents Group)
 David Prowse MLA (Liberal)

Candidates

Results

|}

See also
 Members of the Australian Capital Territory Legislative Assembly, 1992–1995
 Third Follett Ministry
 List of Australian Capital Territory elections

External links
 ACT Electoral Commission
 ACT Legislative Assembly - List of Members (1989 - 2008)

References

Elections in the Australian Capital Territory
1992 elections in Australia
February 1992 events in Australia
1990s in the Australian Capital Territory